Dame Pamela Felicity Gordon, DBE (born 1955) is a Bermudian politician who served as Premier of Bermuda from March 1997 until November 1998.

Early life and education
Gordon was born in 1955, the daughter of Edgar F. Gordon, a civil rights activist and labour leader who died six months before her birth and Mildred Layne Bean. Gordon was the youngest of five children born to her father and mother. Gordon became pregnant at 16 which meant she was forced to leave the private school she attended. She subsequently attended Alma College in Ontario, Canada. Gordon attended Queen's University in Kingston Ontario, Canada and earned a Master of Business Administration degree.

She married the father of her daughter and they had another child, a son. However, their marriage ended in divorce. She is currently married to S. Andrew Banks.

Career
Prior to entering politics, Gordon owned and managed a restaurant. Gordon was appointed to the Bermuda Senate in 1990 representing the United Bermuda Party. The centre-right United Bermuda Party was the main opponent of the centre-left Progressive Labour Party founded by the political associates of her father. Gordon served as cabinet minister for Youth Development, Sports and Recreation between 1992-95. She was elected as a Member of Parliament in 1993, representing Southampton West and became Minister for the Environment, Planning, and Natural Resources, 1995. In 1997 Gordon became leader of UBP and the Premier of Bermuda. She was the youngest Premier and the first female Premier.

After office
Gordon has been active in a number of organizations and campaigns concerning gender equality. Gordon chaired the Scholarship committee with the Montpelier Foundation. She also serves on the Queen's University Smith School of Business Global Council. She was inducted into the Council of Women World Leaders.  She serves as Chairman of the Global Rhodes Scholar Selection Committee.

Honours
Gordon has been honoured as a Dame Commander of the Most Excellent Order of the British Empire by Queen Elizabeth in 2004. Gordon received an honorary Doctor of Laws (LLD) degree from the University of New Brunswick in 1998. In 2013, she subsequently received an honorary Doctor of Laws degree (LLD) from her alma mater, Queen's University in Canada
In December 2015 Gordon was honoured at a gala in New York celebrating female empowerment hosted by the Girl Be Heard theatre company. The company praised Gordon, saying "Dame Pamela Gordon-Banks has broken countless ceilings, educationally and economically. She thinks globally and acts locally". Gordon Banks is the recipient of the 2019 George Parkin Service Award at Oxford University.

References

Living people
1955 births
20th-century Bermudian businesspeople
Women heads of government of non-sovereign entities
Premiers of Bermuda
United Bermuda Party politicians
Leaders of the Opposition (Bermuda)
20th-century women rulers
Women government ministers of Bermuda
20th-century British women politicians
21st-century British women politicians